Isis Unveiled: A Master-Key to the Mysteries of Ancient and Modern Science and Theology, published in 1877, is a book of esoteric philosophy and Helena Petrovna Blavatsky's first major work and a key text in her Theosophical movement.

The work has often been criticized as a plagiarized occult work, with scholars noting how Blavatsky extensively copied from many sources popular among occultists at the time. Isis Unveiled is nevertheless also understood by modern scholars to be a milestone in the history of Western esotericism.

Overview
The work was originally entitled The Veil of Isis, a title which remains on the heading of each page, but had to be renamed once Blavatsky discovered that this title had already been used for an 1861 Rosicrucian work by W. W. Reade. Isis Unveiled is divided into two volumes. Volume I, The "Infallibility" of Modern Science, discusses occult science and the hidden and unknown forces of nature, exploring such subjects as forces, elementals, psychic phenomena, and the Inner and Outer Man. Volume II, Theology, discusses the similarity of Christian scripture to Eastern religions such as Buddhism, Hinduism, the Vedas, and Zoroastrianism. It follows the Renaissance notion of prisca theologia, in that all these religions purportedly descend from a common source; the ancient "Wisdom-Religion". Blavatsky writes in the preface that Isis Unveiled is "a plea for the recognition of the Hermetic philosophy, the anciently universal Wisdom-Religion, as the only possible key to the Absolute in science and theology."

Isis Unveiled is argued by many modern scholars such as Bruce F. Campbell and Nicholas Goodrick-Clarke to be a milestone in the history of Western Esotericism. Blavatsky gathered a number of themes central to the occult tradition—perennial philosophy, a Neo-Platonic emanationist cosmology, adepts, esoteric Christianity—and reinterpreted them in relation to current developments in science and new knowledge of non-Western faiths. In doing so, Isis Unveiled reflected many contemporary controversies—such as Darwin's theories on evolution and their impact on religion—and engaged in a discussion that appealed to intelligent individuals interested in religion but alienated from conventional Western forms. Blavatsky's combination of original insights, backed by scholarly and scientific sources, accomplished a major statement of modern occultism's defiance of materialist science.

In later theosophical works some of the doctrines originally stated in Isis Unveiled appeared in a significantly altered form, drawing out confusion among readers and even causing some to perceive contradiction. Specifically, the few and—according to many—ambiguous statements on reincarnation as well as the threefold conception of man as body, soul and spirit of Isis Unveiled stand in contrast to the elaborate and definite conception of reincarnation as well as the sevenfold conception of man in The Secret Doctrine (1888). Blavatsky later asserted the correctness of her statements on reincarnation and the constitution of man in Isis Unveiled, attributing the resulting confusion and alleged contradictions to the more superficial or simplified conceptions of the ideas in Isis Unveiled compared to those of later works.

Modern Theosophists hold the book as a revealed work dictated to Blavatsky by Theosophy's Masters.

Critical reception

Detractors often accuse the book of extensive plagiarism, a view first seriously put forth by William Emmette Coleman shortly after publication and still expressed by modern scholars such as Mark Sedgwick. Similarly, historian Geoffrey Ashe noted that Isis Unveiled combines "comparative religion, occultism, pseudoscience, and fantasy in a mélange that shows genuine if superficial research but is not free from unacknowledged borrowing and downright plagiarism." Indeed, Isis Unveiled makes use of many sources popular among occultists at the time, often directly copying significant amounts of text. Historian Bruce Campbell concluded that the large number of borrowed lines suggested plagiarism "on a large scale." Modern copies of Isis Unveiled are often annotated, fully delineating Blavatsky's sources and influences.

Theosophical scholar Moon Laramie goes a step further in Blavatsky Unveiled Volume 1 rendering the first seven chapters of Isis Unveiled into contemporary English. In addition, the book corrects many misconceptions about Blavatsky’s sources. For example, Blavatsky cites the work of the Byzantine historian George Kedrenos, although her primary source was not his Synopsis Historion but the less impressive-sounding Conjuror's Magazine, or Magical and Physiognomical Mirror Volume II printed 1791–1793. 

Historian Ronald H. Fritze considers Isis Unveiled to be a work of pseudohistory. Likewise, Henry R. Evans, a contemporaneous journalist and magician, described the book as a "hodge-podge of absurdities, pseudo-science, mythology and folk-lore, arranged in helter-skelter fashion, with an utter disregard of logical sequence." 

One of Blavatsky's original goals in writing Isis Unveiled and founding the Theosophical Society was to reconcile contemporary advances in science with occultism, and this synthesis was one of the main appeals of Blavatsky's work for individuals interested in religion but alienated from conventional Western forms at the time. 

K. Paul Johnson has suggested that many of the more mythical elements of Blavatsky's works, like her later Masters, rather than being outright inventions, were reformulations of preexisting esoteric ideas and the casting of a large group of individuals—who helped, encouraged, or collaborated with her—under a mythological context; all driven by Blavatsky's search for spiritual truth.

Sten Bodvar Liljegren notes that in addition to contemporaneous occult sources and the prevailing orientalism of the period, the novels of Edward Bulwer-Lytton heavily influenced Blavatsky's Theosophical ideas.

See also 
 Spiritism
 Theosophy and Christianity

Notes

References

Further reading
 Campbell, Bruce F. (1980) Ancient Wisdom Revived: A History of the Theosophical Movement. Berkeley & Los Angeles, CA: University of California Press.
 Farquhar, J. N. (1915). Theosophy. In Modern Religious Movements in India. Macmillan Company.
 
 Godwin, Joscelyn. (1994) The Theosophical Enlightenment. Albany, NY: State University of New York Press.
 Helena Blavatsky: Western Esoteric Masters Series. (2004) ed. by Nicholas Goodrick-Clarke. Berkeley, CA: North Atlantic Books.
 Johnson, K. Paul. (1994). The Masters Revealed: Madame Blavatsky and the Myth of the Great White Lodge. State University of New York Press.
 Liljegren, Sten Bodvar (1957). Bulwer-Lytton's Novels and Isis Unveiled. Lundequistka Bokhandeln.

External links

 
 

1877 non-fiction books
Books about religion
Books by Helena Blavatsky
Books critical of Christianity
Books about the paranormal
New Age predecessors
Books involved in plagiarism controversies
Theosophical texts
Pseudoscience literature